End It All is a 2011 studio album by American rapper Beans, released on Anticon. Produced by Four Tet and Tobacco, among others, it features a guest appearance from Tunde Adebimpe.

Critical reception
At Metacritic, which assigns a weighted average score out of 100 to reviews from mainstream critics, End It All received an average score of 68% based on 15 reviews, indicating "generally favorable reviews".

Eric Grandy of Pitchfork gave the album a 7.3 out of 10, calling it "another well-earned notch in Beans' solo belt and a testament to the strength of his artistic vision". Bram Gieben of The Skinny gave the album 4 stars out of 5, saying, "Crucially, at 33 minutes, and most tracks under four, End It All never outstays its welcome."

Track listing

Personnel
Credits adapted from liner notes.

 Beans – vocals
 Dan Huron – recording
 Earl Blaize – recording
 Fred Ones – recording
 Daddy Kev – mastering
 Ron Croudy – design
 Beowulf Sheehan – photography

References

External links
 

2011 albums
Beans (rapper) albums
Anticon albums